Russell Ian George (born 1974) is a Welsh Conservative Party politician who has been the Montgomeryshire Member of the Senedd (MS) since the 2011 election.

Background
Russell was born in Welshpool and brought up in Montgomeryshire. He attended Birmingham City University, achieving a BA (Hons) degree in Information and Media Studies, and has lived in Montgomeryshire all his life. He owns a home entertainment business in Newtown called Fuze.

County Councillor
In 2008 Russell was elected to Powys County Council to represent the Newtown Central ward. Following this, he was elected by the County Councils’ Welsh Conservative group to be one of its representatives on the Council’s executive management board a position he held until 2011. He stood down as a Councillor in 2017.

Shadow Cabinet
Following his Senedd (then Assembly) win in 2011, Russell was appointed as the Shadow Secretary for Energy and Sustainable Development.
Following the 2016 Assembly Election he became the Conservatives spokesman for Economy and Infrastructure he also chairs the Assembly's Economy, Infrastructure and Skills Committee.

References

External links

Russell George Official website
Assembly Member Profile Profile on National Assembly website

Offices held

1974 births
Living people
People from Welshpool
Conservative Party members of the Senedd
Councillors in Wales
Members of Powys County Council
Wales AMs 2011–2016
Wales MSs 2016–2021
Wales MSs 2021–2026
Alumni of Birmingham City University